Pleissner Gallery is an exhibit building located at the Shelburne Museum in Shelburne, Vermont.

History
In 1986 the museum erected Pleissner Gallery to house the estate of Ogden Minton Pleissner (1905-1983), which he had bequeathed to the museum. Pleissner was a close friend of the Webb family who earned national recognition during his lifetime for his realist watercolor and oil landscapes and sporting scenes. The main gallery functions as a rotating exhibition space dedicated to displaying works from Pleissner's diverse portfolio, while the adjoining room houses a recreation of Pleissner's Manchester, Vermont, studio complete with canvases, brushes, and personal memorabilia.

The gallery features 40 of the museum's 600 Pleissner works in a rotating exhibition. The gallery shows watercolors and oil paintings from all periods of Pleissner's career, including early renderings, Western landscapes, works from war-torn France and England, and sporting scenes.

Ogden Pleissner
Pleissner received his formal training at the Art Students League in New York City. During the 1930s he spent summers in Wyoming, building a reputation as an accomplished painter of Western landscapes. Pleissner served as a war artist for the U.S. Air Force and Life magazine during World War II, completing many watercolors in war-torn France and England. In later years he painted in Europe, Nova Scotia, New York City (where he maintained a winter studio), and Vermont. Pleissner was the recipient of many honors and awards, including a gold medal from the American Watercolor Society.

References

 Shelburne Museum. 1993. Shelburne Museum: A Guide to the Collections. Shelburne: Shelburne Museum, Inc.
 Shelburne Museum map

Shelburne Museum
Art museums and galleries in Vermont
Buildings and structures in Shelburne, Vermont
1986 establishments in Vermont
Art museums established in 1986